Crystal Brook may refer to several places:

Australia
Crystal Brook (creek), in South Australia
Crystal Brook, Queensland, a locality in the Whitsunday Region
Crystal Brook, South Australia, a town north of Adelaide
Crystalbrook, Queensland, a locality in Shire of Mareeba

United States
Crystal Brook (Beaver Kill tributary), Delaware County, New York
Crystal Brook (East Brook tributary), Delaware County, New York